The 2002 Kärcher Canadian Junior Curling Championships were held January 19–27 at the Silver Fox Curling and Yacht Club and at Cahill Stadium in Summerside, Prince Edward Island. The winning teams represented Canada at the 2002 World Junior Curling Championships.

Men's

Teams

Standings

Results

Draw 1

Draw 2

Draw 3

Draw 4

Draw 5

Draw 6

Draw 7

Draw 8

Draw 9

Draw 10

Draw 11

Draw 12

Draw 13

Draw 14

Draw 15

Draw 16

Draw 17

Draw 18

Playoffs

Semifinal

Final

Women's

Teams

Standings

Results

Draw 1

Draw 2

Draw 3

Draw 4

Draw 5

Draw 6

Draw 7

Draw 8

Draw 9

Draw 10

Draw 11

Draw 12

Draw 13

Draw 14

Draw 15

Draw 16

Draw 17

Draw 18

Playoffs

Tiebreaker

Semifinal

Final

Qualification

Ontario
The Teranet Ontario Junior Curling Championships were held January 2–6 at the Unionville Curling Club in Unionville.

Julie Reddick of Oakville defeated Melanie Robillard's Ottawa Curling Club rink in the women's final 5–3. In the men's final, Jeff Armstrong of Owen Sound beat Guelph's Jason Newland 8–4.

External links
Women's statistics 
Men's statistics

References

Canadian Junior Curling Championships
Curling competitions in Prince Edward Island
Sport in Summerside, Prince Edward Island
Canadian Junior Curling Championships
2002 in Prince Edward Island
January 2002 sports events in Canada